Hovatipula is a genus of true crane fly.

Distribution
Madagascar

Species
H. cubitalbella Alexander, 1963
H. kallion Alexander, 1960
H. megalothorax (Alexander, 1955)
H. pheletes Alexander, 1960

References

Tipulidae
Diptera of Africa